Grzegorz Pater  (born 5 March 1974 in Kraków) is a Polish professional footballer who plays for Podgórze Kraków.

Career
He formerly played for clubs like Wisła Kraków, Górnik Polkowice and Podbeskidzie Bielsko-Biała. Pater was also known for scoring two goals in the 3rd Champions League qualification round against F.C. Barcelona on 8 August 2001.

Pater made one appearance for the Poland national football team against Iceland in 2001.

References

External links
 

1974 births
Living people
Polish footballers
Poland international footballers
Wisła Kraków players
Górnik Polkowice players
Footballers from Kraków
Association football midfielders